Anne Morrison Piehl (born November 13, 1964) is an American economist and criminologist. She is a professor of economics at Rutgers University, the director of Rutgers' Program in Criminal Justice, and a research associate at the National Bureau of Economic Research. She joined Rutgers as an associate professor in 2005, and became a full professor there in 2012. Also in 2012, she became a fellow of the IZA Institute of Labor Economics. In 2020, she was named to the James Cullen Chair in Economics, where she will serve a five-year term. She served on the New Jersey Committee on Government Efficiency and Reform Corrections/Sentencing Task Force, prepared expert testimony for the New Jersey Institute of Social Justice, and testified before Congress and the United States Sentencing Commission. Her research interests include prisoner reentry programs and prison violence.

References

External links
Piehl's faculty page

Rutgers University faculty
1964 births
Living people
American criminologists
American women economists
21st-century American economists
Harvard University alumni
Princeton University alumni
American women criminologists
21st-century American women